The 1976 Denver WCT, also known as the 1976 United Bank Tennis Classic for sponsorship reasons, was a men's professional tennis tournament. It was held on indoor carpet courts in Denver, Colorado. It was the fifth edition of the tournament and was held from 19 April through 25 April 1976. The tournament was part of the 1976 World Championship Tennis circuit. First-seeded Jimmy Connors won the singles title and the accompanying $17,000 first prize.

Finals

Singles
 Jimmy Connors defeated  Ross Case 7–6, 6–2
 It was Connor's 5th singles title of the year and the 46th of his career.

Doubles
 John Alexander /  Phil Dent defeated  Jimmy Connors /  Billy Martin 6–7, 6–2, 7–5

References

External links
 ITF tournament edition details

Denver WCT
Indoor tennis tournaments
Denver WCT
Denver WCT
Denver WCT